Castilleja praeterita is a species of Indian paintbrush known by the common name Salmon Creek Indian paintbrush. It is endemic to the High Sierra Nevada of California, where it grows in dry sagebrush meadows.

Description
This is a branching perennial herb growing a hairy stem up to about 45 centimeters in maximum height. The linear leaves are 3 to 5 centimeters long. The glandular, hairy inflorescence is made up of pale green bracts tipped in pale red to bright yellow. Between the bracts emerge the pouched flowers which are tinted with purple or yellow along the edges.

References

External links
Jepson Manual Treatment
Photo gallery

praeterita
Endemic flora of California
Flora of the Sierra Nevada (United States)
Plants described in 1970